Sail Loft may refer to:

Sail Loft (Tenants Harbor, Maine), listed on the National Register of Historic Places in Knox County, Maine
Sail Loft (Vermilion, Ohio), listed on the National Register of Historic Places in Erie County, Ohio